Shari L. Barkin is an American pediatrician. In 2021, she was elected a Member of the National Academy of Medicine for "pioneering pragmatic randomized controlled trials in community settings, undertaken in collaboration with parents and community partners, and addressing health disparities in pediatric obesity."

Early life and education
Barkin was born and raised in Maryland as the daughter of a doctor and a nurse. She completed her undergraduate degree at Duke University before completing her medical degree at the University of Cincinnati. After her pediatric residency at Children's Hospital Los Angeles, Barkin was selected as a UCLA Robert Wood Johnson Clinical Scholar and completed a fellowship in Health Services Research. During her time in Cincinnati, she was influenced by Norma Wagner who identified her as a "change agent."

Growing up, Barkin danced with The Washington Ballet and hitchhiked across Australia and New Zealand.

Career
Following her residency and fellowship, Barkin accepted an academic position at Wake Forest University. She eventually left Wake Forest to join joined Vanderbilt University Medical Center in 2006.

As the director of the Division of General Pediatrics at the Monroe Carell Jr. Children's Hospital at Vanderbilt, Barkin was elected to serve as vice president of the Society for Pediatric Research in 2014 and president in 2016. Following this, she was named 2018 Pediatrician of the Year by the Tennessee Chapter of the American Academy of Pediatrics. In 2019, Barkin was also honored with the Academic Pediatric Association Research Award for her work in youth violence and obesity.

In 2021, she was elected a Member of the National Academy of Medicine for "pioneering pragmatic randomized controlled trials in community settings, undertaken in collaboration with parents and community partners, and addressing health disparities in pediatric obesity."

Personal life
Barkin and her husband, Jeff Frumkin, have three children together.

References

External links

Living people
Physicians from Maryland
Duke University alumni
University of Cincinnati College of Medicine alumni
Vanderbilt University faculty
Wake Forest University faculty
Members of the National Academy of Medicine
Year of birth missing (living people)